Ctenophorus adelaidensis, commonly known as the western heath dragon is a species of agamid lizard occurring in sandplains with heath and banksia along the lower coast of Western Australia, between Kalbarri and Perth. Adults are grey in colour, with dark blotches. They are relatively slow compared to other Ctenophorus species, preferring to scuttle rather than sprint.

References

adelaidensis
Agamid lizards of Australia
Endemic fauna of Australia
Reptiles of Western Australia
Reptiles described in 1841
Taxa named by John Edward Gray